The 2003 New York Jets season was the franchise's 34th season in the National Football League (NFL), the 44th season overall, and the third under head coach Herman Edwards. The team tried to improve upon its 9–7 record from 2002 and defend its AFC East title, but the Jets failed to do so and finished with a record of 6–10, they finished with a losing record for the first time since 1996 and missing the playoffs for the first time since 2000.

Offseason

NFL draft

Staff

Roster

Preseason

Regular season
During the 2003 regular season the Jets’ non-divisional, conference opponents were primarily from the AFC South, although they also played the Pittsburgh Steelers from the AFC North, and the Oakland Raiders from the AFC West. Their non-conference opponents were from the NFC East.

Schedule

Note: Intra-division opponents are in bold text.

Standings

External links
 2003 team stats

New York Jets seasons
New York Jets
New York Jets season
21st century in East Rutherford, New Jersey
Meadowlands Sports Complex